Mortgage Lifter is the name given to a cultivar of tomato developed by Willam Estler of Barboursville, West Virginia, in 1922. He registered the name in 1932, several years before "Radiator Charlie" and his "Radiator Charlie's Mortgage Lifter". Robert Howard Estler, last remaining son of William Estler, died in October 2012.

According to many sources on the Internet, the Mortgage Lifter was not developed by Willam Estler. Instead, it is said to have been developed by M.C. "Radiator Charlie" Byles in Logan, West Virginia. Byles is said to have developed it in the early 1930s. However, as mentioned above, Byles' and Estler's breeds are distinct cultivars.

Byles' and Estler's cultivars are only the most well-known of a number of Great Depression-era tomato breeds named "Mortgage Lifter". These were developed for the nursery plant market, and named after their presumably high saleability, which allowed small-scale plant nurseries and farmers to recover from debt.

See also 

 List of tomato cultivars

References

External links 
 Picture Gallery from Google Images

Heirloom tomato cultivars